Olsobip Rural LLG is a local-level government situated in North Fly District of Western Province of Papua New Guinea. In the year 2000, the LLG was the least populous of the district, with a population of only 3851 people. The capital of the LLG is a station town by the name of Olsobip.

Wards
01. Bolangun
02. Kongabip
03. Laubip
04. Imigabip
05. Duwinim/Tamtem
06. Golgobip
07. Bolibip
08. Darabik
09. Duminak
10. Biangabip
11. Selbang
12. Seltamin
13. Fagobip
14. Saganabip
15. Yasap
16. Dahamo

References

Local-level governments of Western Province (Papua New Guinea)